Northland Township is the name of some places in the U.S. state of Minnesota:
Northland Township, Polk County, Minnesota
Northland Township, St. Louis County, Minnesota

Minnesota township disambiguation pages